Menuha is a moshav in south-central Israel. Located to the north of Kiryat Gat and south of Kiryat Malakhi, it falls under the jurisdiction of Lakhish Regional Council.

History
It was founded in 1953 by Jewish refugees to Israel from Kurdistan region of Iraq on land belonging to the Arab Palestinian villages of Summil and  Jusayr, both of which were depopulated in the 1948 Arab–Israeli War.

Along with neighboring Nahla, it was named after "Biblical passage "Blessed be the Lord who has given rest to his people Israel ..." (1 Kings 8:56) and for the Menuha VeNahala (Hebrew: מנוחה ונחלה) organization that founded Rehovot. Menuha means "rest" or "ease" in Hebrew.

References

Moshavim
Populated places established in 1953
Populated places in Southern District (Israel)
1953 establishments in Israel
Iraqi-Jewish culture in Israel